Elections to Cookstown District Council were held on 17 May 1989 on the same day as the other Northern Irish local government elections. The election used three district electoral areas to elect a total of 16 councillors.

Election results

Note: "Votes" are the first preference votes.

Districts summary

|- class="unsortable" align="centre"
!rowspan=2 align="left"|Ward
! % 
!Cllrs
! % 
!Cllrs
! %
!Cllrs
! %
!Cllrs
! % 
!Cllrs
!rowspan=2|TotalCllrs
|- class="unsortable" align="center"
!colspan=2 bgcolor="" | SDLP
!colspan=2 bgcolor="" | DUP
!colspan=2 bgcolor="" | UUP
!colspan=2 bgcolor="" | Sinn Féin
!colspan=2 bgcolor="white"| Others
|-
|align="left"|Ballinderry
|bgcolor="#99FF66"|29.0
|bgcolor="#99FF66"|2
|25.6
|2
|21.1
|1
|24.3
|1
|0.0
|0
|6
|-
|align="left"|Cookstown Central
|26.3
|2
|bgcolor="#D46A4C"|29.5
|bgcolor="#D46A4C"|2
|27.6
|1
|11.4
|0
|5.2
|0
|5
|-
|align="left"|Drum Manor
|21.5
|1
|16.8
|1
|21.4
|1
|bgcolor="#008800"|24.0
|bgcolor="#008800"|1
|16.3
|1
|5
|- class="unsortable" class="sortbottom" style="background:#C9C9C9"
|align="left"| Total
|25.8
|5
|24.0
|5
|23.2
|3
|20.3
|2
|6.7
|1
|16
|-
|}

District results

Ballinderry

1985: 2 x DUP, 2 x Sinn Féin, 1 x SDLP, 1 x UUP
1989: 2 x DUP, 2 x SDLP, 1 x Sinn Féin, 1 x UUP
1985-1989 Change: SDLP gain from Sinn Féin

Cookstown Central

1985: 2 x DUP, 1 x SDLP, 1 x UUP, 1 x Sinn Féin
1989: 2 x DUP, 2 x SDLP, 1 x UUP
1985-1989 Change: SDLP gain from Sinn Féin

Drum Manor

1985: 1 x Sinn Féin, 1 x SDLP, 1 x UUP, 1 x DUP, 1 x Independent Unionist
1989: 1 x Sinn Féin, 1 x SDLP, 1 x UUP, 1 x DUP, 1 x Independent Unionist
1985-1989 Change: No change

References

Cookstown District Council elections
Cookstown